Amstutz is a surname. Notable people with the surname include:

Adrian Amstutz (born 1953), Swiss politician
Dan Amstutz (1932–2006), American lobbyist
Hobart Baumann Amstutz (1896–1980), American Methodist bishop
Reto Amstutz (born 1993), Swiss ice hockey player
Ron Amstutz (born 1952), American politician
Tom Amstutz (born 1955), American football coach